Darlingia darlingiana is a rainforest tree of the family Proteaceae from Northern Queensland. It was described by Ferdinand von Mueller in 1865 as Helicia darlingiana.

References

Proteaceae
Endemic flora of Queensland
Proteales of Australia
Taxa named by Ferdinand von Mueller